Jefferson Township is one of sixteen townships in Elkhart County, Indiana. As of the 2010 census, its population was 9,688, up 3,143 from 6,545 in 2000, the largest numeric increase of any of the 16 townships in Elkhart County over that timespan.

Geography

Adjacent townships
 Washington Township (north)
 York Township (northeast)
 Middlebury Township (east)
 Clinton Township (southeast)
 Elkhart Township (south)
 Concord Township (west)

Major highways

Cemeteries
The township contains four cemeteries: Cornell, Morris, Neff and Pine Creek.

References
 
 United States Census Bureau cartographic boundary files

External links
 Indiana Township Association
 United Township Association of Indiana

Townships in Elkhart County, Indiana
Townships in Indiana